The Connacht GAA Football Under-20 Championship, known simply as the Connacht Under-20 Championship, is an annual inter-county Gaelic football competition organised by the Connacht Council of the Gaelic Athletic Association (GAA). It is the highest inter-county football competition for male players between the ages of 17 and 20 in the province of Connacht. The championship was contested as the Connacht Under-21 Championship between 1964 and 2016 before changing to an under-20 age category from 2018. It is sponsored by EirGrid.

The final, currently held in March, serves as the culmination of a series of games played during a three-week period, and the results determine which team receives the J. J. Fahy Cup. The championship has always been played on a straight knockout basis whereby once a team loses they are eliminated from the championship.

The Connacht Championship is an integral part of the wider GAA Football Under-20 All-Ireland Championship. The winners of the Connacht final, like their counterparts in the other three provinces, advance to the semi-final stage of the All-Ireland series of games.

Five teams currently participate in the Connacht Championship. Mayo are the most successful team with 25 titles, followed by Galway with 21 titles. The title has been won at least once by all five teams, with four of them winning the title more than once. Sligo are the current champions.

Current format

Overview

The Connacht Championship is a single elimination tournament. Each team is afforded only one defeat before being eliminated from the championship. Pairings for matches are drawn at random and there is currently no seeding. Each match is played as a single leg. If a match is drawn there is a period of extra time, however, if both sides are still level at the end of extra time a replay takes place and so on until a winner is found.

Progression

Qualification for subsequent competitions

The Connacht Championship winners gain automatic entry to the semi-final stage of the All-Ireland Championship.

Managers

Managers in the Connacht Championship are involved in the day-to-day running of the team, including the training, team selection, and sourcing of players from the club championships. Their influence varies from county-to-county and is related to the individual county boards. The manager is assisted by a team of two or three selectors and an extensive backroom team consisting of various coaches. The under-20 team manager also works closely with the senior team manager due to an overlap of players on both teams. Prior to the development of the concept of a manager in the 1970s, teams were usually managed by a team of selectors with one member acting as chairman.

Top winners

Roll of honour

Records and statistics

Final

Team

Most titles: 25:
 Mayo (1967, 1968, 1970, 1971, 1973, 1974, 1975, 1976, 1980, 1983, 1984, 1985, 1986, 1994, 1995, 1997, 2001, 2003, 2004, 2006, 2007, 2008, 2009, 2016, 2018)
Most consecutive title wins: 4:
Mayo (1973, 1974, 1975, 1976)
Mayo (1983, 1984, 1985, 1986)
Mayo (2006, 2007, 2008, 2009)
Most appearances in a final: 35:
Galway (1964, 1965, 1969, 1972, 1973, 1975, 1976, 1978, 1979, 1980, 1981, 1982, 1984, 1985, 1987, 1988, 1989, 1990, 1991, 1992, 1993, 1996, 1997, 1998, 2000, 2002, 2003, 2005, 2006, 2011, 2013, 2015, 2017, 2019, 2020)
Most appearances in a final without winning: 9:
Sligo (1979, 1994, 1995, 1999, 2001, 2009, 2010, 2012, 2017)

Teams

By decade

The most successful team of each decade, judged by number of Connacht Championship titles, is as follows:

 1960s: 2 each for Galway (1964-65), Roscommon (1966-69) and Mayo (1967-68)
 1970s: 6 for Mayo (1970-71-73-74-75-76)
 1980s: 5 for Mayo (1980-83-84-85-86)
 1990s: 5 for Galway (1990-92-93-96-98)
 2000s: 7 for Mayo (2001-03-04-06-07-08-09)
 2010s: 4 each for Roscommon (2010-12-14-15) and Galway (2011-13-17-19)

Gaps

Top three longest gaps between successive championship titles:
 17 years: Roscommon (1982-1999)
 14 years: Leitrim (1977-1991)
 11 years: Roscommon (1999-2010)

References

Sources
 History of Connacht GAA (2002)
 Roll of Honour on gaainfo.com

3
Connacht